The Southern League Cup 1941–42 was the second edition of the regional war-time football tournament.

Group stage

Group A

Group B

Group C

Group D

Semi-finals

Final

Teams

References

External links
Southern League Cup at Scottish Football Historical Archive (archived version, 2009)

season
1941–42 in Scottish football